The Ack Ack Handicap is a Grade III race for  Thoroughbred horses run at Hollywood Park in June.

Open to horses aged three and up, the Ack Ack is set at a distance of  furlongs and offers a purse of $100,000. It was raced on dirt since its inaugural running in 2001 until 2007 after the new synthetic Cushion Track had been installed.

The race is named for the great Ack Ack, inducted into the National Museum of Racing and Hall of Fame in 1986 and the Horse of the Year in 1971, as well as ranking number 44 in the Blood-Horse magazine List of the Top 100 U.S. Racehorses of the 20th Century.

This race was run as a stake in 2001.

Records
Speed record:
 1:27.15 - Joey Franco (2003)

Winners of the Ack Ack Handicap

References
 Hollywood Park Media Guide

Graded stakes races in the United States
Horse races in California
Hollywood Park Racetrack
Recurring sporting events established in 2001
2001 establishments in California